Windels Marx is a full-service law firm headquartered in New York City. The firm provides a broad-based general legal practice centering on corporate, bankruptcy, litigation, real estate, banking, and other major business practice areas.

History
The firm was created by a merger between Windels, Marx, Davies & Ives, a firm founded in the 1830s, and Lane & Mittendorf. In its infancy, the firm provided a number of integral representations, including litigation defending Thomas Edison's ownership of the creation of the lightbulb and the original incorporation of IBM in the 1920s.

As of 2016, the firm employs approximately 140 legal professionals in four offices, headquartered in the CitySpire Center in New York City, with additional locations in Connecticut and New Jersey.

Recognition
The firm appears on U.S. News & World Report's annual ranking of top law firms, with particular emphasis on the firm's Banking and Finance practice groups in addition to its Bankruptcy practice.

Windels Marx is regularly featured in the Forbes Legal Blackbook, a compendium of elite law firms recognized for providing critical legal services to major U.S. and global corporations.

Notable professionals
Reena Raggi, United States Circuit Judge of the U.S. Court of Appeals for the Second Circuit, was formerly a partner of Windels Marx.

Anthony R. Coscia, a partner of the firm, served as Chairman of the National Railroad Passenger Corp. (Amtrak), the Port Authority of New York and New Jersey.

References

External links
Official Website
The Cox Law Firm
Personal Injury Lawyer

Law firms based in New York City